Mount Rat is a former subdivision in South Australia located in the locality of Wauraltee on the Yorke Peninsula. It is located near the junction of the Spencer Highway and Mount Rat Road about halfway between the centres of Maitland and Minlaton. It was first founded in the 1850s, and by 1882 had a school, hotel, blacksmiths, chapel and a large water tank. By 1905 the school had closed, and now the town has mostly disappeared. 
There are two water tanks and a telecommunications tower at Mount Rat.

References

External links
Mount Rat Home Page on Veryphotographic.com.au

Ghost towns in South Australia